The 1896 Amateur Hockey Association of Canada season was the tenth season of play of the league. Each team played eight games, and Montreal Victorias were first with a 7–1 record. During the season, on February 14 the Victorias hosted a Stanley Cup challenge match with the Winnipeg Victorias club. Winnipeg won 2–0 to win the Cup.

Executive 

 Watson Jack, Victorias (President)
 Weldy Young, Ottawa (1st. Vice-Pres.)
 Clarence Mussen, Montreal (Sec.-Treasurer)

Season 

The Crystals were allowed to change their name to Shamrocks, which matched their new affiliation with the Shamrock A.A.A.

Highlights 

The Victorias were truly the class of the league and only lost once, 3–2 to Ottawa. Their regular season team goal total was nearly double that of Ottawa.

Final Standing

Playoffs 
There were no playoffs as Montreal won first place exclusively.

Exhibitions 

After the season, Montreal and Shamrocks played an exhibition series of games in the United States:

 Washington, March 7, 1896
 Shamrocks 3, Montreal 1

Baltimore, March 9, 1896
 Montreal 6, Shamrocks 5

 New York, March 10, 1896
 Montreal 1, Shamrocks 1 ( completed March 11 with Shamrocks winning 2–1)

The Montreal Victorias travelled to New York City for an exhibition against the New York Athletic Club. The Athletic Club records the date as March 4, (although the date conflicts with an AHAC game), won by the Vics 6–1.

Stanley Cup challenge

Victorias vs. Winnipeg at Montreal 

The first successful challenge to the Cup came in February 1896 by the Winnipeg Victorias, the champions of the Manitoba Hockey Association (MHA). On February 14, Winnipeg beat defending champion Montreal Victorias, 2–0, becoming the first team outside the AHAC to win the Cup. Winnipeg took a 2–0 lead in the first half of the game on goals by Armytage and Campbell, then played on the defensive in the second half.

Stanley Cup engraving

1896 Winnipeg Victorias

Schedule and results 

† Victorias clinch league championship.

Player statistics

Goaltending averages 
Note: GP = Games played, GA = Goals against, SO = Shutouts, GAA = Goals against average

Scoring leaders

See also 
 1895–96 MHA season
 List of Stanley Cup champions
 List of pre-NHL seasons

References 

 
 Podnieks, Andrew Lord Stanley Cup, Fenn Publishing Company, Ltd. 2004
 
 

Notes

Amateur Hockey Association of Canada seasons
AHAC